Futures is an international, peer-reviewed, multidisciplinary journal concerned with futures studies. It is published by Elsevier. The editor is Ted Fuller.

It is one of the journals that in the 1970s contributed to creating a debate on the topics of sustainable development.

See also

Technological Forecasting and Social Change
Foresight
 Futures & Foresight Science
Journal of Futures Studies
European Journal of Futures Research

References

External links
Elsevier publishing

Futurology journals
English-language journals